Polytechnic West  (formerly Swan TAFE) was a State Training Provider established under section 35 of the Vocational Education and Training Act 1996 (WA)  based in Perth, Western Australia. Polytechnic West is one of the largest training providers in the state and teaches and instructs in a range of areas from trade-based apprenticeships to business and finance to aviation across its eight campuses in Bentley, Carlisle, Midland, Thornlie, Balga, Jandakot and two Armadale campuses.

Polytechnic West had existed under various guises since the early 20th century, when Perth Technical School was established to train professional and skilled workers to for the new railway technologies that supported the state's agriculture and mining industries. The most recent change was from Swan TAFE in 2009 as part of a government initiative in which State Training Providers were granted more independence and encouraged to "reinvent themselves to meet the requirements of the volatile economic climate". The Polytechnic's reinvention has seen it branch out into areas normally untouched by State Training Providers (STP), and was the first STP to teach Higher Education.

Polytechnic West was Western Australia's Large Training Provider of the Year in 2011.

In April 2016, the Government of Western Australia announced the reform of the TAFEs. Polytechnic West was merged with the Challenger Institute, to become the South Metropolitan TAFE. Starting from 2017, the campuses in Midland and Balga were transferred to the North Metropolitan TAFE.

Courses
Polytechnic West offers over 400 courses in areas including: 
 Access, English & Languages
 Aerospace
 Animals & Horticulture
 Automotive
 Building, Construction & Furniture
 Business & Finance
 Community, Children & Education
 Creative & Design
 Electrical, Electronics & Telecommunications
 Engineering, Metals & Mining
 Hospitality & Food Trades
 Occupational Health & Fitness
 Information Technology
 Refrigeration, Plumbing & Gas

Polytechnic West award courses are in line with the Australian Quality Training Framework (AQTF). The AQTF establishes standard titles and levels for courses across Australia. The qualifications that are currently offered include:
 Associate Degree
 Advanced Diploma
 Diploma
 Certificate IV
 Certificate III
 Certificate II
 Certificate I

Campuses and facilities
Polytechnic West currently has 8 campuses. They are:
 Armadale
 Armadale Equine Training Centre
 Balga
 Bentley
 Carlisle
 Jandakot
 Midland
 Thornlie

Notes

External links

TAFE WA